Cheboksary is the capital city of Chuvashia, Russia, and a port on the Volga River.

Geography
The city is located in the Volga Upland region and stands on the shore of the Cheboksary Reservoir.

History
Cheboksary was first mentioned in written sources in 1469, but according to archaeological excavations, the area had been populated much earlier. The site hosted a Bulgarian city of Veda Suvar, which appeared after Mongols defeated major Volga Bulgarian cities in the 13th century. During Khanate period the town is believed by some to have had a Turkic (probably, Tatar) name Çabaqsar and that the current Russian and English names originate from it. However, in maps by European travelers it was marked as Cibocar (Pizzigano, 1367), Veda-Suar (Fra Mauro, 1459). Shupashkar, the Chuvash name literally means the "fortress of the Chuvash".

In 1555, the Russians built a fortress and established a settlement here. In 1625, there were 458 soldiers quartered in Cheboksary, and in 1646 there were 661 males living in the settlement. At the end of the 17th century, Cheboksary was regarded as a major commercial city of the Volga region, and in 1781 it was granted town status within Kazan Governorate. In the beginning of the 19th century the population was about 5500, the town had a sawmill and several small manufactures.

In the 16th and the first half of the 17th century the Vvedensky cathedral, four monasteries and eight churches had been built, in the 18th century the stone buildings of treasury and archive, magistracy, court, and ten churches. In 1880, here were counted 783 houses (33 of them from stone), 91 stores, 3 schools, 2 hospitals, and a bank.

In the beginning of the 20th century, 5,100 people lived in Cheboksary. In 1965, the population was 163,000.

Administrative and municipal status
Cheboksary is the capital of the republic. Within the framework of administrative divisions, it is, together with two urban-type settlements (Novye Lapsary and Sosnovka) and two rural localities, incorporated as the city of republic significance of Cheboksary—an administrative unit with the status equal to that of the districts. As a municipal division, the city of republic significance of Cheboksary is incorporated as Cheboksary Urban Okrug.

City divisions
For administrative purposes, Cheboksary is divided into three city districts: Kalininskiy, Leninskiy, and Moskovskiy.

Demographics
Population: 

The city of Cheboksary together with the satellite city Novocheboksarsk forms a polycentric agglomeration with a population of more than 680 thousand people.

Ethnic composition
The population of Cheboksary consists mainly of the two following ethnic groups; the Chuvash (62%), and ethnic Russians (34%). Mixed marriages are quite common.

Culture
Cheboksary possesses many cultural opportunities. These include the Public Order (Badge of Honor) Russian Drama Theater, a philharmonic orchestra, the Chuvash State Puppet Theater and numerous theaters (showing productions in both Russian and Chuvash languages). However, a very popular gathering place for the locals is the recently completed zaliv (bay), situated in the middle of the city. Cheboksary also has boardwalks and beaches along the Volga River, where people swim in the summer. There are also a number of heated pools, health clubs, and museums (including the Chuvash National Museum and Russia's only beer museum).

Cheboksary hosted a language festival in 1996.

Sport
Cheboksary regularly hosts athletics meetings and racewalking events, including the 2008 IAAF World Race Walking Cup, the 2015 European Team Championships Super League, and the 2016 Russian athletics and masters athletics championships. The 2016 IAAF World Race Walking Team Championships were moved from Cheboksary to Rome as part of IAAF sanctions against doping in Russia.

Education
Educational institutions include the Chuvash State University, Chuvash State Agriculture Academy, the Chuvash State Pedagogical University, and the Cheboksary Cooperative Technical School.
Cheboksary Physics and Mathematics School
Cheboksary Cooperative Institute

Economy
Cheboksary is the location of the headquarters of the Concern Tractor Plants, Russia's leading machine building company and one of the largest heavy mechanical engineering companies in the world.

Transportation

Local public transportation 

An extensive system of trolleybuses, autobuses, and minibuses covers the city, providing quick, convenient access to all parts of the city. For those who prefer taxis, there are several taxi agencies available, but the favorite means of transportation among locals are so-called "Gypsy" cabs. In Russia, anybody who owns a car is potentially a taxi. This can be a convenient way to get around but it is also potentially dangerous. Official taxis cost less than 6 dollars for travel between most points within the city.

River 

Because the Volga River runs through Chuvashia, Cheboksary is a frequent stop on the many boat tours that travel along the major cities up and down the Volga.
To the south, Volgograd, Rostov-on-Don, Astrakhan, the Caspian Sea, and Black Sea are directly reachable. To the west, the Volga River connects Cheboksary with Nizhny Novgorod, Yaroslavl, Moscow, and the northern regions of Russia. By using river-sea vessels, it is possible to take cargo from Chuvash riverports all the way to Saint Petersburg, Novorossiysk (on the Black Sea), Astrakhan, and ports situated on the Danube river. However, the river is frozen from December to April.

Air 
The Cheboksary Airport (IATA CSY, ICAO UWKS, international airport since 1995) receives both cargo and passenger aircraft of practically all types and sizes. There are regularly scheduled flights to Moscow and other destinations. Chuvashia Airlines was based at this airport until operations ceased in 2009.
Cheboksary is located about a four-hour drive from Strigino International Airport near Nizhny Novgorod, which offers more flight connections.

Climate
The climate in the region is continental (Köppen: Dfb), and it is similar to the climate in Moscow, although colder in winter, which lasts from late November until late March with a permanent snow cover.

Gallery

Notable people
 
 
Yuri Yevlampyev (born 1966), former Russian professional footballer

Twin towns – sister cities

Cheboksary is twinned with:

 Afyonkarahisar, Turkey 
 Eger, Hungary
 Grodno, Belarus
 Rundu, Namibia
 Santa Clara, Cuba

References

Notes

Sources

External links

Official website of Cheboksary 
Cheboksary Business Directory 
Photos from Cheboksary

 
Cheboksarsky Uyezd
Populated places on the Volga